Lix Technologies is a Danish startup focused on creating a learning platform for students. It is a platform that can be used for accessing textbooks. Students can purchase their textbooks through Lix and make notes in the application – from there it is possible to share notes with other students.

Lix raised 18 million DKK (2.6 million USD) in a 2016 funding round with North Media, a publicly traded Danish Company.

References

External links
http://borsen.dk/nyheder/avisen/artikel/11/138899/artikel.html
http://borsen.dk/nyheder/avisen/artikel/11/138901/artikel.html
http://penge.borsen.dk/artikel/3/2154481/north_media_kaber_20_pct_af_lix_technologies.html
http://nyheder.tv2.dk/business/2016-03-17-22-aarig-sover-paa-venindes-sofa-nu-ruller-millionerne-ind
https://www.lix.com/en/contact/

Danish brands
Education companies of Denmark
Danish companies established in 2015